Daweerit Chullasapya (born August 19, 1983) is a Thai actor. He is best known for his role as Sao Kya Seng in the 2015 american drama film, Twilight Over Burma. In 2017–present, he has presented in lead role as the second great king of Siam King Naresuan in part two of The Legend of King Naresuan: The Series.

Filmography

Film

Television dramas

Television series
 2015 Wifi Society (ไวไฟ โซไซตี้) (GMM Grammy-GMMTV/One 31) as Ken (เคน) (Guest)
 2016 Sot Story Season 1 (Exact as Kin (คิน)
 2016 Diary of Tootsies (ไดอารีตุ๊ดซีส์ เดอะซีรีส์) (GDH 559-Parbdee Tawesuk-Jor Kwang Films/GMM 25) as ChampPae, Champagne (แชมป์เป้ / แชมเปญ) (Guest in season 2)
 2018 Club Friday The Series 9 (Club Friday the Series 9 รักครั้งหนึ่ง ที่ไม่ถึงตาย ตอน รักที่ไม่มีจริง) (A Time Media/GMM 25) as Ak (เอก) with Rhatha Phongam
 2019 Wolf (Wolf เกมล่าเธอ) (GMMTV/One 31) as Robert (โรเบิร์ต) (Guest)
 2019 Nobody Happy (2019) (Nobody's Happy ข่าวร้ายให้รัก) (Trasher , Bangkok/Facebook-YouTube-Line TV) as Maitree (ไมตรี)
 2019 Instinct (2019) (Instinct ซ่อน ล่า หน้าสัตว์) (Kantana/LINE TV) as Ben (เบน)
 2021 Bangkok Breaking (Bangkok Breaking มหานครเมือง(ห)ลวง) (/Netflix) as Jo (Wanchai's brother) (โจ้)
 2021 Not Me (Not Me เขา...ไม่ใช่ผม) (GMMTV/GMM 25) as Tawi Kuerkulsvasti
 2023 Midnight Motel Aep Lap Rongraem Rak (Midnight Motel แอปลับ โรงแรมรัก) (GMMTV/GMM 25) as Jay
 2023  (The Interns หมอมือใหม่) (Bear In Mind Studios/Thai PBS) as Dr.Taiphob Dechanuwatchara (นพ.ไตรภพ เดชานุวัชร)

Television sitcoms
 2016 Suea Chanee Keng (เสือ ชะนี เก้ง ตอน) (The One Enterprise/One 31) as Chai (Guest)

Music video appearance
 2011 Yahk Hai Roo ...(Kid Teung Tur Ka Nard Nai) (อยากให้รู้ (คิดถึงเธอขนาดไหน)) - Auttapon Prakopkong (We Records/YouTube:Musicwerecordsgmm)

References

External links
 

Living people
1983 births
Daweerit Chullasapya
Daweerit Chullasapya
Daweerit Chullasapya
Daweerit Chullasapya
Daweerit Chullasapya
Daweerit Chullasapya
Daweerit Chullasapya
Daweerit Chullasapya